Carl Gersbach (born January 8, 1947) is a former professional American football player who played linebacker for seven seasons for the Philadelphia Eagles. Minnesota Vikings, San Diego Chargers, Chicago Bears, and St. Louis Cardinals.  He played football at Duke University, and at West Chester State University (from which he graduated), after playing at Swarthmore High School in Swarthmore, Pennsylvania, and at The Manlius School in Manlius, New York.

References

1947 births
Living people
American football linebackers
Chicago Bears players
Duke Blue Devils football players
Minnesota Vikings players
Philadelphia Eagles players
San Diego Chargers players
St. Louis Cardinals (football) players
West Chester Golden Rams football players
Players of American football from Syracuse, New York
Manlius Pebble Hill School alumni